David Breda (born 4 January 1996) is a Czech football player who currently plays for FK Varnsdorf on loan from FK Jablonec. He joined Varnsdorf on loan in August 2017.

References

External links
 
 

1996 births
Living people
Czech footballers
Association football midfielders
FK Jablonec players
FK Varnsdorf players
FK Dukla Prague players
Czech First League players
Czech National Football League players